Breid Bay is a bay about  wide, irregularly indenting, for as much as , the ice shelf fringing the coast of Queen Maud Land. This feature was charted and descriptively named "Breidvika" ("broad bay") by H.E. Hansen, as a result of aerial photographs made on February 6, 1937, by the Lars Christensen Expedition of 1936–37.

References 

Bays of Queen Maud Land
Princess Ragnhild Coast